Edoardo Girardi (born 22 October 1985 in Busto Arsizio) is an Italian former road cyclist.

Major results
2007
 1st Gran Premio di Poggiana
 4th GP Capodarco
2008
 2nd Gran Premio Città di Felino
 3rd Ruota d'Oro
 6th Gran Premio Inda
 6th Trofeo Città di Brescia
2011
 7th Gran Premio Città di Camaiore
 9th Trofeo Matteotti
2012
 8th Trofeo Laigueglia

References

External links

1985 births
Living people
Italian male cyclists
People from Busto Arsizio
Cyclists from the Province of Varese